Sir Hamilton can refer to:

Bill Hamilton (engineer), New Zealander who developed the modern jetboat.
Sir Charles Hamilton, 3rd Baronet, British army officer.
Sir Edward Hamilton, 1st Baronet, Royal Navy admiral
Edward Walter Hamilton, political diarist.
Frederick Hamilton (soldier), 17th-century soldier and planter.
Sir George Hamilton, 1st Baronet, British politician.
Sir George Hamilton, 1st Baronet of Donalong, 17th-century Irish baronet.
Ian Standish Monteith Hamilton, British Army general.
James Hamilton of Cadzow, 15th-century Scottish nobleman.
James Hamilton, 1st Earl of Abercorn, Scottish nobleman.
James Hamilton, 4th Duke of Hamilton, general and peer.
John Hamilton, 1st Lord Belhaven and Stenton, 17th-century Scottish nobleman.
Lewis Hamilton, British racing driver, activist, fashion designer and musician.
Patrick Hamilton of Kincavil, 16th-century Scottish nobleman.
Robert George Crookshank Hamilton, governor of Tasmania.
Sir Robert North Collie Hamilton, 6th Baronet, 19th-century English politician and East India Company civil servant.
Thomas Hamilton, 1st Earl of Haddington, Scottish peer.
William Hamilton (diplomat), 18th-century Scottish diplomat.
Sir William Hamilton, 9th Baronet, Scottish metaphysician.
William Rowan Hamilton, Irish scientist.